Delaware has three county boards of election which are charged with the calculation and certification of election results, election dispute resolution, validation of qualified voter rolls and of materials used during elections, such as voting machines.  Delaware also has a State Election Commissioner who is appointed by the Governor and confirmed by the Delaware Senate.

In a 2020 study, Delaware was ranked as the 18th hardest state for citizens to vote in.

Elections

2024 election
2024 U.S. Senate
Delaware gubernatorial election, 2024

2022 elections

2022 U.S. House
Delaware Attorney General election, 2022
 Delaware State Treasurer election, 2022

2020 elections

2020 Presidential election
2020 Democratic presidential primary
2020 Republican presidential primary
2020 U.S. Senate
2020 U.S. House
Delaware gubernatorial election, 2020
Delaware lieutenant gubernatorial election, 2020
Wilmington mayoral election, 2020

2018 elections

2018 U.S. Senate
2018 U.S. House
Delaware Attorney General election, 2018
Delaware State Treasurer election, 2018
Delaware House of Representatives election, 2018
Delaware elections, 2018

2016 elections

2016 Presidential election
2016 Democratic presidential primary
2016 U.S. House
Delaware gubernatorial election, 2016
Delaware lieutenant gubernatorial election, 2016
Wilmington mayoral election, 2016

2014 elections

2014 U.S. Senate
2014 U.S. House
Delaware elections, 2014

2012 elections

2012 Presidential election
2012 U.S. Senate
2012 U.S. House
Delaware gubernatorial election, 2012
Delaware lieutenant gubernatorial election, 2012
Wilmington mayoral election, 2012

2010 elections

2010 U.S. Senate
2010 U.S. House
2010 U.S. House
Delaware elections, 2010

2008 elections

2008 Presidential election
2008 Presidential Democratic primary
2008 Presidential Republican primary
2008 U.S. Senate
2008 U.S. House
2008 Gubernatorial

2006 elections

2006 U.S. House

2004 elections

2004 Presidential election
2004 Presidential Democratic primary
Delaware gubernatorial election, 2004

See also
Political party strength in Delaware
Delaware gubernatorial elections
List of United States Senate elections in Delaware
United States presidential elections in Delaware
Women's suffrage in Delaware

References

External links
Delaware Commissioner of Elections official website

 
 
  (State affiliate of the U.S. League of Women Voters)
 

 
Government of Delaware
Political events in Delaware